Ratauli is a village in Supaul district of the Indian state of Bihar, located 20 km east of Supaul and 204 km from Patna.

References 
 

Villages in Supaul district